Francisco Vicera (born 10 August 1923) was a Filipino wrestler. He competed in the men's freestyle bantamweight at the 1948 Summer Olympics.

References

External links
 

1923 births
Possibly living people
Filipino male sport wrestlers
Olympic wrestlers of the Philippines
Wrestlers at the 1948 Summer Olympics
Place of birth missing